Charaxes gallagheri, the Gallagher's charaxes, is a butterfly in the family Nymphalidae. It is found in central and eastern Zimbabwe and Zambia. The habitat consists of granite-boulder hills in savanna.

There are two generations per year with adults on wing from November to December and again from late February to April.

The larvae feed on Diospyros natalensis.

Taxonomy
Charaxes gallagheri is a member of the large species group Charaxes etheocles.

References

Victor Gurney Logan Van Someren, 1966 Revisional notes on African Charaxes (Lepidoptera: Nymphalidae). Part III. Bulletin of the British Museum (Natural History) (Entomology) 45-101.

External links
Charaxes gallagheri images at Consortium for the Barcode of Life

Butterflies described in 1962
gallagheri